Medart is an unincorporated community in Wakulla County, Florida, United States.

Schools in Medart
Medart Elementary School
Wakulla Middle School
Wakulla High School

References

Unincorporated communities in Wakulla County, Florida
Tallahassee metropolitan area
Unincorporated communities in Florida